Paul Joseph McGugan (born 17 July 1964) is a Scottish former professional footballer who played as a central defender for Celtic, Barnsley and Chesterfield.

Career

McGugan signed for Celtic from Eastercraigs Amateurs in April 1980. He made his first team debut at 19 years of age in a 3–2 win over Hibernian on 28 April 1984.

However it would be over a year later – season 1985–86 – before he got a sustained run in the first team. That season McGugan made 21 league appearances for Celtic and played in both legs of their first round European Cup Winner's Cup tie against Atlético Madrid. A highlight for McGugan that season was his goal on 1 January 1986 in a 2–0 win over Rangers at Parkhead. The season also saw McGugan win a league championship medal in dramatic fashion as Celtic crushed St Mirren 5–0 on the last day of the season as title rivals Hearts lost 2–0 away at Dundee.

McGugan also played regularly the following season, but the arrival of Billy McNeill as manager in the summer of 1987 saw him drop out of the first team. In October 1987, McNeill sold McGugan to Barnsley for £55,000.

McGugan spent three years in Yorkshire playing for Barnsley, including a memorable 4–0 win over Chelsea in the third round of the FA Cup in January 1989, before moving to Chesterfield in 1990.

References

1964 births
Living people
Scottish footballers
Celtic F.C. players
Barnsley F.C. players
Chesterfield F.C. players
Scottish Football League players
English Football League players
Footballers from Glasgow
Association football central defenders